Potassium amyl xanthate (/pəˈtæsiəm ˌæmɪl ˈzænθeɪt/) is an organosulfur compound with the chemical formula CH3(CH2)4OCS2K. It is a pale yellow powder with a pungent odor that is soluble in water. It is widely used in the mining industry for the separation of ores using the flotation process.

Production and properties
As typical for xanthates, potassium amyl xanthate is prepared by reacting n-amyl alcohol with carbon disulfide and potassium hydroxide.
 CH3(CH2)4OH  +  CS2  +  KOH →  CH3(CH2)4OCS2K  +  H2O

Potassium amyl xanthate is a pale yellow powder.  Its solutions are relatively stable between pH 8 and 13 with a maximum of stability at pH 10.

Related compounds
Sodium amyl xanthate is used in the separation of nickel and copper from their ores.

Safety
The  is 90-148 mg/kg (oral, rat). 

It is a biodegradable compound.

References

Salts
Organosulfur compounds